Aplosporella is a genus of fungi in the family Botryosphaeriaceae. There are about 225, or 277 species.

Species

Aplosporella acaciae
Aplosporella acaciigena
Aplosporella aesculi
Aplosporella aguirrei
Aplosporella ahmadii
Aplosporella ailanthi
Aplosporella aleuritis
Aplosporella allamandae
Aplosporella alnicola
Aplosporella alpina
Aplosporella amelanchieris
Aplosporella amygdalina
Aplosporella annonae
Aplosporella aquifolii
Aplosporella araliae
Aplosporella aristolochiae
Aplosporella artabotrydicola
Aplosporella asiminae
Aplosporella astragalina
Aplosporella astrocaryi
Aplosporella aurangabadensis
Aplosporella avellanae
Aplosporella azadirachtae
Aplosporella baccharidicola
Aplosporella bakeriana
Aplosporella bambusina
Aplosporella baptisiae
Aplosporella baxteri
Aplosporella beaumontiana
Aplosporella behboudii
Aplosporella betulae
Aplosporella bignoniae
Aplosporella bogoriensis
Aplosporella bougainvilleae
Aplosporella bouwardiae
Aplosporella brasiliensis
Aplosporella briosiana
Aplosporella bromeliae
Aplosporella brunaudiana
Aplosporella burnhamii
Aplosporella burserae
Aplosporella cadabae
Aplosporella caesalpiniae
Aplosporella calycanthi
Aplosporella camerunensis
Aplosporella capparis
Aplosporella carbonacea
Aplosporella carpinea
Aplosporella castaneae
Aplosporella casuarinae
Aplosporella ceanothi
Aplosporella celtidis
Aplosporella centrolobiicola
Aplosporella cephalandrae
Aplosporella cercidis
Aplosporella cesatii
Aplosporella chamaecristae
Aplosporella chlorostroma
Aplosporella cissi
Aplosporella clematidis
Aplosporella clerodendri
Aplosporella clintonii
Aplosporella coffeicola
Aplosporella commixta
Aplosporella congoensis
Aplosporella connata
Aplosporella coryli
Aplosporella crotonis
Aplosporella crypta
Aplosporella cryptostegiae
Aplosporella cumulata
Aplosporella cupressicola
Aplosporella cydoniae
Aplosporella cydoniaecola
Aplosporella cymbidii
Aplosporella cynanchina
Aplosporella cytisi
Aplosporella cytisigena
Aplosporella daemiae
Aplosporella dalbergiae
Aplosporella demersa
Aplosporella dendritica
Aplosporella diatrypoides
Aplosporella diospyri
Aplosporella dothideoidi
Aplosporella dracaenarum
Aplosporella druparum
Aplosporella dryobalonopis
Aplosporella dulcamarae
Aplosporella elaeagni
Aplosporella elaeagnina
Aplosporella elaeidis
Aplosporella ellisii
Aplosporella embeliae
Aplosporella enterolobii
Aplosporella ephedricola
Aplosporella eriobotryae
Aplosporella euonymi
Aplosporella fabiformis
Aplosporella fautreyana
Aplosporella fici
Aplosporella fici-elasticae
Aplosporella ficina
Aplosporella flacourtiae
Aplosporella foliicola
Aplosporella francisci
Aplosporella fraxini
Aplosporella fusca
Aplosporella gallae
Aplosporella gardeniae
Aplosporella germanica
Aplosporella gleditschiae
Aplosporella gleditschiicola
Aplosporella gossypii
Aplosporella grandinea
Aplosporella grewiae
Aplosporella hedericola
Aplosporella hesperidica
Aplosporella heveae
Aplosporella hibisci
Aplosporella hydrangeae
Aplosporella indica
Aplosporella insitiva
Aplosporella insueta
Aplosporella ipomoeae
Aplosporella iranica
Aplosporella jasmini
Aplosporella jasminina
Aplosporella jodinae
Aplosporella juglandina
Aplosporella juniperi
Aplosporella justiciae
Aplosporella kochiae-prostratae
Aplosporella lactucicola
Aplosporella lagerstroemiae
Aplosporella lantanae
Aplosporella laricina
Aplosporella lathami
Aplosporella leucaenicola
Aplosporella lilacis
Aplosporella lilii
Aplosporella linderae
Aplosporella linearis
Aplosporella liquidambaris
Aplosporella longipes
Aplosporella lonicerae
Aplosporella lussoniensis
Aplosporella lutea
Aplosporella machaerii
Aplosporella maclurae
Aplosporella madablotae
Aplosporella mali
Aplosporella malloti
Aplosporella malorum
Aplosporella manilensis
Aplosporella marathwadensis
Aplosporella marginata
Aplosporella melanconioides
Aplosporella meliae
Aplosporella melianthi
Aplosporella melogrammata
Aplosporella memecyli
Aplosporella metastelmatis
Aplosporella mexicana
Aplosporella microspora
Aplosporella minor
Aplosporella minuta
Aplosporella missouriensis
Aplosporella moelleriana
Aplosporella mori
Aplosporella moricola
Aplosporella moringcola
Aplosporella murrayae
Aplosporella negundinis
Aplosporella neilliae
Aplosporella nerii
Aplosporella neriicola
Aplosporella nervisequa
Aplosporella novae-hollandiae
Aplosporella nyctanthis
Aplosporella obscura
Aplosporella oleae
Aplosporella oleae-dioicae
Aplosporella opaca
Aplosporella opuntiae
Aplosporella palmacea
Aplosporella palmaceae
Aplosporella palmicola
Aplosporella pandanicola
Aplosporella parallela
Aplosporella passiflorae
Aplosporella peckii
Aplosporella pelargonii
Aplosporella pennsylvanica
Aplosporella pentatropidis
Aplosporella peristrophes
Aplosporella phyllanthina
Aplosporella pilocarpi
Aplosporella pilocarpina
Aplosporella pini
Aplosporella pistaciarum
Aplosporella platani
Aplosporella plumeriae
Aplosporella populi
Aplosporella prinsepiae
Aplosporella propullulans
Aplosporella prosopidina
Aplosporella prosopidincola
Aplosporella prosopidis
Aplosporella pruni
Aplosporella prunicola
Aplosporella psidii
Aplosporella puncta
Aplosporella quisqualidis
Aplosporella rhamni
Aplosporella rhizophila
Aplosporella rhoina
Aplosporella ribicola
Aplosporella ribis
Aplosporella robiniae
Aplosporella rosae
Aplosporella rosarum
Aplosporella roxburghii
Aplosporella rubicola
Aplosporella ruborum
Aplosporella rugosa
Aplosporella rumicicola
Aplosporella ruscigena
Aplosporella ruthenica
Aplosporella sacchari
Aplosporella salicicola
Aplosporella salmaliae
Aplosporella sambuci
Aplosporella sambucina
Aplosporella sarmenticola
Aplosporella schreberae
Aplosporella seriata
Aplosporella sesbaniae
Aplosporella sidae
Aplosporella smilacis
Aplosporella solani
Aplosporella squieriae
Aplosporella staphylina
Aplosporella stephanotidis
Aplosporella sterculiae
Aplosporella subconfluens
Aplosporella subhyalina
Aplosporella syconophila
Aplosporella symphoricarpi
Aplosporella syriaca
Aplosporella tabernaemontanae
Aplosporella talae
Aplosporella tamaricis
Aplosporella tecomae
Aplosporella terricola
Aplosporella thalictri
Aplosporella thespesiae
Aplosporella thevetiae
Aplosporella thujae
Aplosporella tiliacea
Aplosporella tiliae
Aplosporella tingens
Aplosporella tylophorae
Aplosporella ulmea
Aplosporella vallaridis
Aplosporella valsispora
Aplosporella vanderystii
Aplosporella velata
Aplosporella vernoniae
Aplosporella viburni
Aplosporella violacea
Aplosporella viticola
Aplosporella vivanii
Aplosporella wistariae
Aplosporella wladicaucasica
Aplosporella woodfordiae
Aplosporella xanthii
Aplosporella xanthiicola
Aplosporella yalgorensis
Aplosporella ziziphina
Aplosporella ziziphi-sativae
Aplosporella zollikoferiae

References

External links
Index Fungorum

Botryosphaeriaceae